Andrew Dutkewych (born 1944, Vienna) is a Canadian contemporary artist known for his sculptural works.

Life
Dutkewych was born in Vienna in 1944. 
In 1966 he received a Bachelor of Arts from Philadelphia College of Art (1966) as well as a degree from the Slade School of Fine Art in London. Dutkewych is a professor of sculpture at Concordia University in Montreal.

Work
Dutkewych works mainly in the areas of drawing, sculpture and public art.

Public art

Dutkewych's 1977 work Cascade III is in the collection of the Gananoque Sculpture Park.  In 1981 he installed his work Hole In The Sky permanently in the sculpture garden of the Art Gallery of Algoma.  His public fountain-sculpture Autour et de très près (1992) is installed on the campus of the Université du Québec à Montréal.  He created the permanent public artwork Entre Nous in 1992 for the Pointe-à-Callière Museum in Montreal. The piece, created through Quebec's "1% for art" program, consists of a large and a small bronze casting integrated with a stone bench, situated at the convergence of two streets that enclose the museum.

Collections 
In addition to the permanent collections holding Dutkewych's works are also held in the permanent collections of the Musée national des beaux-arts du Québec and the Montreal Museum of Fine Arts. His works are also held in the permanent collections of the Art Gallery of Nova Scotia and the Leonard & Bina Ellen Art Gallery at Concordia University.

Publications

References

1944 births
Living people
Canadian academics of fine arts
Academic staff of Concordia University
Canadian sculptors
Canadian male sculptors